Pinocchio: The Series, also known as Saban's The Adventures of Pinocchio and known as  in Japan, is a 52-episode anime series by Tatsunoko Productions first aired on Fuji Television in 1972, which was edited by Saban in 1990. The story is based on the 1883 novel The Adventures of Pinocchio by Italian author Carlo Collodi.

Unlike the lighter, more cheerful tones of the Disney film adaptation and Nippon Animation's version Piccolino no Bōken, this series has a distinctly darker, more sadistic theme, and portrays the main character, Pinocchio (Mock), as suffering from constant physical and psychological abuse and freak accidents.

Setting
This version tells a story of an extremely gullible, naive and morally confused wooden doll/marionette brought to life by a mystical turquoise-haired fairy. Pinocchio (Mock) is characterized as having many character faults which he must learn to overcome in order to be worthy of being granted humanity. Some of these character faults include selfishness, sarcasm, insensitivity, indolence, obstinacy, dupability, self-pity, over-trusting, gullibility, stupidity, disobedience, compulsive lying, arrogance, greed, cowardice, recklessness, pettiness, cruelty, foolishness and an inability to learn from mistakes.

For example, during the fifth episode, "What is a Heart", Pinocchio actually resorts to committing attempted murder to acquire a child's heart because he thinks it will help him become a real boy. Throughout the entire series Pinocchio (Mock), partly due to his own delinquency and repetitive disobedience, must undergo other costly ordeals of hardship and pain in which he is continuously tormented. In the tenth episode, "When my nose gets longer", Pinocchio is forcefully adopted by a Nobleman and becomes a Prince, whereupon he becomes so corrupted with wealth and privileges that he becomes extremely cruel to his servants and charges about his adopted father's estates on horseback, randomly riding down any person who gets in his way, whilst laughing at the terror, indignity and danger inflicted upon others for his personal amusement. Pinocchio is of course severely punished by the blue fairy for these acts of utter selfishness who makes his nose turn into a small tree. Pinocchio is consequently disowned and cast out naked into the wilderness by his adopted father who can not stop laughing at him as he is dragged away crying out in vain for mercy. The episode ends with a forlorn Pinocchio weeping as he fumbles through the castle's surrounding undergrowth, naked and cold because his ex-adopted father has taken away his expensive attire. There are clearly illustrated scratches etched into the wood of his body from the surrounding vegetation. The subsequent episode sees Pinocchio transform into a small tree with a face and with roots fixed deep into the soil so that he can no longer move. He is eventually found by a wood cutter who chops him down and sells him as a novelty singing tree.

The cultural backdrop of these episodes seem to suggest an alpine region during the mid to late 19th century, only with an added mythical theme which includes creatures such as vampires, fairies, witches, dragons, demons and mermaids as well as talking animals and not to mention of course a living puppet. Such backdrops could include countries in Europe such as Switzerland, Transylvania, Tyrol, Austro-Hungary or even the Papal States or the Alps regions of Northern Italy.

Plot overview
The story begins with an oak tree losing a branch in a storm, which is found by an elderly, childless, woodcarver who carves it into a marionette child to keep him company and names him Pinocchio (Mokku in the Japanese version, derived from the Japanese word "Moku" meaning wood). That night the fairy of the oak tree grants Geppetto's wish by giving Pinocchio life, though she'll only be able to give him humanity once he has earned it. From there Pinocchio goes on a number of adventures in both his village and the surrounding area, typically involving him either ignoring Cricket's advice and getting in trouble as a result or trying to do something good and somebody else (usually a talking animal or one of his classmates, particularly Franko) taking advantage of his naivete. However, with the help of Cricket, the Oak Fairy, and his father he's always able to escape whatever situation he finds himself in, either through direct help or figuring out a solution based on advice he's given, and returns home having learnt an important lesson about life and what it means to be human.

The focus of the story shifts at the end of episode 29 where, after helping to defend his village from bandits, Pinocchio encounters Sneeroff who captures him and later picks up Jack the Fox and Willie the Weasel to tour with him as entertainers. Geppetto heads out in search of him with Charlie the Mouse in tow, though they keep missing each other, and Sneeroff takes the group to Africa to search for diamonds after speaking to a man who made his fortune this way. However the ship they are traveling on is destroyed during a storm and they end up in the wrong part of Africa with Jack and Willie's fates left unknown; from there Pinocchio journeys in search of his father though he often just misses him or has the reunion cut short, during his search he has to rely on his own abilities more than in the past in order to get past the various problems he encounters on his journeys, including Sneeroff. Eventually Pinocchio is able to return to Central Europe where he reunites with Jack and Willie, who become his friends when he helps to free them and a number of other animals from Sneeroff and get the puppeteer arrested for his misdeeds.

Unfortunately when Pinocchio returns to his house he finds that Geppetto has left again to search for him and heads out in search of his father, however, a war is about to break out and a large cedar forest is going to be cleared to make war ships. The trees ask Pinocchio to speak on their behalf as he is half-tree, though nobody listens to him, he is  able to put a plan in motion to scare away the soldiers; unfortunately this results in the army branding him as a product of dark magic and putting a bounty on his head, as well as arresting Geppetto and preparing to send him to the inhospitable "Devil's Island". Thus the puppet heads out again, aided by Jack, Willie and Charlie, to try and rescue his father before he can be sent to the island while avoiding both the authorities and those who want to turn him over for the bounty. Eventually all five of them end up on a ship bound for the island where Pinocchio meets Gina, a girl who was brought as a sacrifice for the monster guarding the island, though when the monster appears Pinocchio fights and defeats it with the help of the Oak Fairy.

In the aftermath of the shipwreck Pinocchio, Gina and Geppetto are stranded on Devil's Island where they manage to survive for a time with the two children bonding and vowing to be each other's sibling as they care for Geppetto and magically transform the island into a paradise in the process. The three are then rescued by their animal friends and return to Europe shortly before Christmas, however, Gina suddenly falls ill and while he searches for a way to purchase the medicine needed to save her Pinocchio learns that a number of other children have the same illness but the medicine needed to cure them is too expensive and goes to search for the herb needed to cure them instead. While he succeeds in finding the herb and curing the sick children, he is still believed to be the product of sorcery by the army who catches up to and shoots him. Fortunately, the Oak Fairy is able to save him by scaring away the army and transforming the boy into a fully human child, though this means she will no longer be able to appear to him. At the same time, a great light surrounds the sky and the perverse Colonel and his soldiers fall to the ground in fear. The light turns out to be the Fairy Godmother, who, proud of Pinocchio's courage and kindness, brings him back to life as a real boy. Pinocchio takes leave of the Fairy and the story ends with Pinocchio, Geppetto and all his friends contemplating the sky on Christmas night.

English versions
The series was adapted into English in the 1990s by Saban Entertainment under the title Pinocchio: The Series (colloquial also known as Saban's (The) Adventures of Pinocchio). This version was shown in the United States on weekday mornings on HBO in 1992. The on-screen title was given as 'Pinocchio The Series', to emphasize the fact that this was an independent production, unrelated to the Disney's adaptation.

A separate American version was created by Jim Terry (Force Five). Titled The Adventures of Pinocchio, it consisted of several episodes edited together to create a 90-minute movie. This version, released on video in 1984, was dubbed by Harmony Gold and American Way, and released by Century Video Corporation, using different voice actors than the Saban version.

Crew 

 Executive Producer/Planning: Tatsuo Yoshida 
 Producer: Kenji Yoshida, Motoyoshi Maesato 
 Chief Writer: Jinzo Toriumi
 Series Director: Seitaro Hara
 Music: Nobuyoshi Koshibe
 Character Design: Yoshitaka Amano
 Chief Animation Directors: Masayuki Hayashi, Sadao Miyamoto

English version's cast and crew

Pinocchio: The Series 
Voice actors
Pinocchio 
Geppetto 
Puppetmaster Sneeroff 
Dr. Sorrow 
Willie 
Charlie 
Jack 
Cricket 
The Blue Fairy 
Narrator 

Crew
 Music by: Haim Saban & Shuki Levy
 Music orchestrated by: Steve Marston

The Adventures of Pinocchio 
 Production: American Way & Harmony Gold
 Produced and directed by: Jim Terry
 Animation by: Tatsunoko Production
 Original music by: Bullets
 Screenplay/Script: Donald J. Paonessa, Angelo Grillo
 Cut: Donald J. Paonessa

Episodes

English dub movie
The movie begins in a similar manner to the series, with Pinocchio being carved by Geppetto from a fallen oak tree branch and given life by the tree's guardian fairy. The fairy also gives magic to Timothy, a cricket who had been living in the branch (and who narrates the film), that allows him to speak and act as Pinocchio's guardian. Though Geppetto is overjoyed by what's happened, Rudy the mouse living in his home, quickly becomes jealous of the puppet. On the way to school Pinocchio sees a traveling puppet show and is convinced by a classmate to skip class and sell his schoolbooks to see the show, which Timothy advises him against, however the puppeteer soon appears at the pawn shop and buys him from the classmate in exchange for fare to see the show. Saphano the puppeteer forces Pinocchio to perform in his show and Pinocchio worries that he'll never see his father again. That night the other puppets advise him to escape. Though he's nearly caught when he tries to rescue the other puppets as well, he eventually manages to return home to his father.

Some days later Geppetto gives him a gold coin (though in the earlier shots it's clearly copper) to run errands with, Rudy speaks to Sly the Fox and Slick the Weasel who try to trick Pinocchio out of his coin by telling him of a magic tree that neither animals nor humans can uproot, but he may be able to retrieve since he's marionette. Pinocchio successfully retrieves the small tree and follows the animals' instructions to plant the coin next to the tree, only for the animals to dig up the coin when he leaves to get some water, as he's caring for the tree the Oak Fairy appears and admonishes him for his disobedience. Later that night the tree matures rapidly and begins to grow gold coins which attract the attention of both the three animals and the towns people, the latter of which cut down the tree in an effort to get more coins, and Pinocchio returns home and apologises to his father for losing the coin. Geppetto quickly forgives his son who boards up Rudy's mouse hole to keep him away from Slick and Sly.

Another day Pinocchio is on his way to school when he catches the attention of Lord Dominos, the owner of the land Geppetto's cottage is built on, who wants to adopt him as his heir and raises the land tax on the cottage when Geppetto refuses. To save his father Pinocchio allows himself to be adopted by Dominos, but quickly becomes used to his new life begins riding his horse recklessly and chasing after both the household staff and the villagers; Timothy tells him he's become spoiled and lost sight of what's truly important, but the younger puppet dismisses him. However, when he sees his real father in town the next day he realises what he's given up but isn't sure how he can go back; the fairy appears and tries to help him to make the correct decision which results in her turning his nose into a tree branch, though this allows him to leave the castle as Lord Domino has him thrown out. As he tries to returning home he becomes more tree-like and is found by a man who digs him up, puts in a plant pot and has him sing for guests at a party. Having experienced cruelty he realises that his actions were wrong, but the fairy cannot return him to normal until he's performed an act of kindness. He's soon sold to an evil Captain who plans to sell him and some kidnapped children across the sea, however the ship sails into a storm and Pinocchio rescues the other children by allowing them to hold onto him and stay afloat until a rescue boat picks them up. Having performed a selfless act, the fairy is able to use her magic to restore him to normal and guide him home.

One day when Pinocchio goes out to play Saphano finds and abducts him to force him to perform in his show again, he also catches Slick and Sly in a trap and the puppet saves them from being cooked by suggesting they perform as trained animals. Though the two are grateful Pinocchio is depressed to have been taken prisoner and away from his father again, meanwhile Geppetto and a reluctant Rudy go off in search of him. Saphano has Pinocchio perform as a clown alongside the animals and soon grows the act from the three of them performing on street corners to an entire circus, though he mistreats the animals and won't let them out of their cages, prompting the animals to consider going on strike. When Pinocchio goes to speak with him Saphano says he'll only let them out if Pinocchio works well (though Timothy points out it's likely a lie) and then presses him to sign a contract that will make them business partners. The next day Saphano tries to make the animals perform a new act where they jump through a flaming hoop, but they are all too afraid to; Pinocchio offers to try teaching them instead, citing that they're now business partners, but instead he tells the animals that he has a plan to free them. Later when they're performing they sabotage the act, causing the tent to catch fire and collapse and Saphano to be arrested, when Pinocchio is seeing of the animals who were taken from overseas and being returned home Slick and Sly tell him that they weren't planning to return home along with him and that he doesn't need them anyway and he returns home to Geppetto.

When the carnival is in town Pinocchio sneaks into a tent advertising Gloria the Mermaid and realises that she's being held against her will, as the carnival is leaving he throws a rock at Gloria's tank, breaking it open and allowing her to escape. He helps her hide from captain Rodgers, the owner of the carnival, and she tells him that she had been captured by pirates when she swam too far from Mermaid Island. They manage to evade Captain Rodgers by swimming too deep to be seen, and though they are nearly caught when Gloria swims closer to the surface too soon, they eventually make it to Mermaid Island where Gloria is reunited with her Grandmother. Pinocchio wants to stay with Gloria, but cannot as he's not a creature of the sea and if he were to stay he could never see his father again, unfortunately Gloria cannot leave either and Pinocchio leaves heartbroken that he won't be able to see his friend again.

After he returns home Geppetto buys him a new set of clothes to celebrate and Pinocchio meets a girl named Mirelle while playing and is instantly smitten, however she does not realise he's a puppet as his clothing covers his doll joints. After he helps her hide from her governess, who never lets her play outside, Mirelle meets Geppetto and introduces the two to her parents who turn out to be millionaires and allow Pinocchio to stay for a while after hearing about how unhappy she's been. As they play together the two children become close friends, though despite a close call and Timothy urging Pinocchio to tell her the truth, Mirelle never finds out that Pinocchio's a puppet. After Mirelle's birthday party she suggests that the two of them get married when they grow up and Timothy once again tells Pinocchio that hiding his true nature isn't fair to her, especially now that she's thinking of when they grow up, which Pinocchio can't do. Later that night he realises the Cricket was right and wishes he could become human, the Fairy appears and also urges him to tell Mirelle the truth and makes his nose grow when he lies about having told her already, she returns it to normal when he promises to tell Mirelle the next day and leave Pinocchio with the advice that true love cannot exist without honesty. However the next day he still cannot bring himself to reveal his secret and instead claims that he has to go visit his father, Mirelle follows him and he finally tells her the truth but that he might become human one day and if he does he'll return to her; though both children are heartbroken, their respective fathers believe that one day Pinocchio really will become human and they'll be reunited.

Soon it's Christmas and both Pinocchio and Geppetto are looking forward to the holiday, however the evil Colonel Meanio has declared war on Christmas and instructed his soldiers to find and destroy every toy in the village. One of the soldiers goes after Pinocchio, considering a living puppet to be a toy, but Slick and Sly bite him allowing Pinocchio to escape. After hearing of the puppet's existence the Colonel becomes determined to destroy him and has the toys collected thus far burnt; while in hiding Pinocchio meets a group of orphan children who have been rescuing dolls to hold a secret Christmas party and offer him shelter from the soldiers. However, one of the girls is sick and constantly worsening with the only cure being a herb found on Devil's Mountain, which none of them have been able to climb. Pinocchio offers to retrieve the herb and with the help of a tree who saves him from falling manages to climb the mountain, find the herb and cure the girl. Later Pinocchio is enjoying a secret Christmas party with his father and both his animal and human friends, including Mirelle who has come to see him, however the Colonel and his men show up and shoot him. The Oak Fairy then appears and saves him by transforming him into a human child, she then leaves asking that he make the most of the gift she's given him before disappearing into the night sky, Timothy then tells that Pinocchio and Geppetto lived happily ever after and that Timothy himself decided to continue helping other children, including those who were born human.

Music
This series uses several pieces of theme music for different adaptations. The original Japanese opening is "Kashi no Ki Mokku (樫の木モック)" which is sung by Kumiko Onoki. The original Japanese ending theme is "Boku wa kanashii ki-no ningyou (I'm A Sad Wooden Puppet)" which is sung by Moon Drops. Whereas the intro carries an upbeat, "friendly" kids tune, the ending reflects the overall mood of the series.

The English adaptation has two songs, one for the mini movie made from the series, and the other for the actual 52-episode series that aired on HBO. These songs were "Whoa, Oh, Pinocchio" sung by Bullets for the movie, and "He's Pinocchio" produced by Saban. However, in addition, when this series aired on HBO in 1992, Saban used a completely different instrumental theme song with no lyrics which differed from the "He's Pinocchio" song.

"He's Pinocchio" debuted on the Mexican Harmony Gold 1984 film release, this makes "He's Pinocchio" a Mexican Harmony Gold origin track. It was translated into English for the then upcoming 1990 Saban English series, to differ the English theme song for the series, from the Harmony Gold English movie version.

In the Saban version, Shuki Levy reused a lot of the music from the animated TV special The Adventures of Ronald McDonald: McTreasure Island produced by DIC Entertainment.

Home media
Jetix has licensed DVDs of the Saban version across Europe, particularly in the UK, Maximum Entertainment LTD. Jetix has released two DVD volumes, re-released under the titles The Magical World of Pinocchio and The Adventures of Pinocchio. They have the usual censorship (e.g. the cricket's death is not shown).

The Jim Terry compilation film was initially released by Video Gems in 1984, and MasterVision (Harmony Gold's UK counterpart) under its Kids Cartoon Collection label in 1987. It was also released in VHS by Celebrity Home Entertainment (under its Just for Kids label) and GoodTimes Home Video, under its Kids Klassics Home Video division. In the UK, it was also released by Pickwick Video. A remastered re-release was licensed by Liberty International Publishing and released by Warner Home Video (under its Family Entertainment label) on DVD and VHS, in the UK and the United States. Michael Stailey of Dvdverdict.com criticized it for its poor animation and voice acting, as well as its audiovisual transfer to a 1.33:1 full frame and Dolby 5.1 soundtrack.

The original Japanese version has never been released in its entirety on home video either in Japan or overseas; however, 20 episodes were released on 10 VHS tapes in the late 1990s. In addition, 9 episodes were released on three selection DVDs with Volume 1 containing the first three episodes, Volume 2 containing episodes 10, 23, and 28, and Volume 3 containing episodes 36, 44, and 52.

Along with other Saban Entertainment shows and anime, Saban's The Adventures of Pinocchio is owned by The Walt Disney Company, through Saban International/BVS International, Jetix/Fox Kids and Buena Vista International Television. However, there was no Region 1 DVD release for the series.

In popular culture
The Tatsunoko version of Pinocchio can be seen in a 2019 episode of the Brazilian animated series Zuzubaland (Portuguese: Zuzubalândia).
In later work of Tatsunoko Yatterman the whole 41 episode is reference to Kashi No Ki Mokku.

References

External links
 
 
 

Television shows based on The Adventures of Pinocchio
1972 anime television series debuts
Japanese children's animated fantasy television series
Fox Broadcasting Company original programming
Fuji TV original programming
HBO original programming
Tatsunoko Production
Television shows based on children's books
Television series by Saban Entertainment
BBC children's television shows
Television shows set in Italy
Pinocchio films